Sandbach High School is a girls secondary school and sixth form with academy status located in Sandbach, Cheshire.

The school was judged as "Outstanding" by the government inspectorate Ofsted in 2008, and was judged to have retained its Ofsted rating in November 2017. In 2016, the school was ranked in the top 50 schools in the United Kingdom by The Sunday Times Good School Guide.

References

External links

Schools in Sandbach
Academies in the Borough of Cheshire East
Secondary schools in the Borough of Cheshire East
Girls' schools in Cheshire